The Smith River is a  tributary of the Umpqua River in the U.S. state of Oregon. It drains  of the Central Oregon Coast Range between the watershed of the Umpqua to the south and the Siuslaw River to the north.

The river is named for Jedediah Smith, who in 1828 led a party of explorers from Utah overland to northern California and southern Oregon. From California, they traveled north to the Umpqua River, camping along its banks near the mouth of the Smith River on July 13. An attack by Native Americans on July 14 killed 15 of Smith's party. One man escaped by heading north to Tillamook and then Fort Vancouver. Smith and two others who were not in camp at the time of the attack fled east toward the Willamette Valley and survived. The Smith River in California is also named for Smith.

Tributaries
Named tributaries of the Smith River from source to mouth are Spring, Whiskey, Alder, Watering Trough, Sleezer, Tip Davis, Peterson, Redford, and Hall creeks. Then Summit, Hefty, Plank, Clevenger, Beaver, Elk, and Arthur Jones creeks. Next is the South Fork Smith River followed by Salmonberry, Amberson, Panther, Haney, Huckleberry, Deer, Yellow, and Hardenbrook creeks.

Next, continuing downstream, are Cleghorn, Johnson, Slideout, Clabber, Halfway, Mosetown, Blind, Rock, Marsh, Devils Club, South Sister and North Sister creeks. Then Beaver, Carpenter, Coldwater, Clearwater, Blackwell, and Scare creeks. Next is the West Fork Smith River followed by Vincent, Rachel, Johnson, Bear, Little Buck, and Buck creeks.

Then come Fawn, Doe, Dailey, Spencer, Taylor, Wasson, and Murphy creeks. Next is the North Fork Smith River followed by Russian John Gulch, then Eslick, Noel, Cassidy, Joyce, Black, and Brainard creeks. Below that are Otter Slough, Camp Seven Gulch, Hudson Slough, Frantz Creek, and Butler Creek.

Gallery

See also
 List of rivers of Oregon
 List of longest streams of Oregon

References

Works cited
 McArthur, Lewis A., and McArthur, Lewis L. (2003) [1928]. Oregon Geographic Names, 7th ed. Portland: Oregon Historical Society Press. .

External links
Umpqua Watershed Council

Rivers of Oregon
Rivers of Douglas County, Oregon
Oregon Coast Range